Destroyer is a Canadian indie rock band from Vancouver, formed in 1995. The band is fronted by founding member Dan Bejar, with a collective of regular band members and collaborators joining him in the studio and during live performances. Alongside Bejar, Destroyer currently includes longtime producers John Collins (bass) and David Carswell (guitar), Nicolas Bragg (lead guitar), Ted Bois (keyboards), JP Carter (trumpet) and Joshua Wells (drums). 

The band's discography draws on a variety of musical influences, resulting in albums that can sound markedly distinct from one another; in Bejar's words, "That's kind of my goal: to start from scratch every time." Destroyer have released thirteen studio albums to date, with their most recent, Labyrinthitis, released in March 2022.

Career

1996–2001
We'll Build Them a Golden Bridge, Destroyer's 1996 debut, is made up of sixteen lo-fi home-recordings. One reviewer suggested that the album combines Bejar's "gift for melodies" with "a concerted effort to make the recording downright inconsumable; the guitars are always out of tune, and the vocals of Fisher-Price quality. 'Static means punk / tuning is junk,' Bejar moans on one track." Ideas for Songs, released on cassette in 1997, features songs akin to those on his first album. The cassette stemmed from a request to contribute songs for a compilation album.

As Bejar gained popularity in Vancouver's music scene, he was joined by producer John Collins for 1998's City of Daughters, which was recorded at a proper studio. Pitchfork noted that the songs still sounded "homespun", also noting "[t]he wordiness that would become something of a trademark is in full effect", but that "unlike much of what came later, not every line is worthy of examination."

Thief (2000) embodied "Bejar's first stab at matching his grandiose, idiosyncratic vision to a showier sound"; it was the first to feature a backing band on every track. The record's "anthemic yet understated" piano-driven ballads have characteristically enigmatic lyrics, though some reviewers interpreted them as critiques of the music industry.

Streethawk: A Seduction (2001) realized the sonic refinement started with City of Daughters. Bejar put it this way: "I don't think it gives credence to any kind of conceptualization of the records, but I hope that City of Daughters, Thief, and Streethawk will pop into some kind of a progression that ends with Streethawk." A critical success, the album retrospectively received a rating of 9.1/10 from Pitchfork.

2002–2007

The 2002 rock album This Night was a dramatic change in style. The looser, less rehearsed style was criticized as "messy [and] haphazard without purpose", though other critics praised the "beautiful mess of sounds" as "challenging... [and] a powerful, cohesive whole." In a 2006 interview (after the release of Your Blues and Destroyer's Rubies), Bejar said the album "came together pretty quickly – we probably could have used more than four or five days to mix the whole thing, but that's all hindsight. It's still my favorite Destroyer record."

Your Blues (2004) saw Destroyer take another unexpected turn, using MIDI instrumentation for almost all the backing music. Bejar coined the term "European blues" to describe its unique, theatrical sound. One reviewer pointed out that "Bejar's unusual voice sounds more confident, and higher up" in the synth-rich arrangements. In another twist, the EP Notorious Lightning & Other Works reworked six tracks from the record with a live band, the very thing the LP had forsaken (the band was Frog Eyes, who toured with Destroyer in support of Your Blues).

Bejar returned with a live band for 2006's Destroyer's Rubies, delivering his most confident record up to that point. The backing band took new-found prominence and, according to Bejar, "[t]he production seems... warm and lush and pretty focused on just making the band sound good and having everything sit well together." Now magazine observed, "[w]hile the sheer density of Bejar's writing can be overwhelming, Destroyer's Rubies is, on a musical level, the most 'accessible' disc he's released."

2008–2013
For Trouble in Dreams (2008), "there was a scary lack of ideas coming into the record", Bejar admitted. Destroyer's piano player Ted Bois took it upon himself, as an alternative to keyboard and piano accompaniment, to create all string and synth arrangements for the songs. At the time, Bejar said it was the "hardest record" to make.

After the 2009 EP Bay of Pigs came 2011's full-length album, Kaputt (featuring a slightly modified "Bay of Pigs" track). Bejar cited influences such as Miles Davis and Roxy Music for his new jazz-infused, lounge music-inspired, sophisti-pop direction. In multiple interviews, Bejar variously stressed that he "sang in a completely different manner, almost unconscious of even singing, more like speaking into a vacuum, and was really happy with the results." The record entailed a number of firsts for Destroyer: first national television performance (on Late Night with Jimmy Fallon); first official music video; first female backing vocals; and the first time Bejar performed without an instrument on tour – his concentration placed solely on his singing. Kaputt was short listed for the 2011 Polaris Music Prize and was Pitchfork's second best album of 2011.

Smaller in scale, Destroyer's fourth EP Five Spanish Songs is sung entirely in Spanish, Bejar covered songs by Sr. Chinarro (es). Bejar's own tongue-in-cheek press release announcing the new songs began: "It was 2013. The English language seemed spent, despicable, not easily singable."

2014–present
Bejar released Poison Season on August 28, 2015. Bejar notes that the album's sound grew from "just really getting into what we were sounding like playing live [following Kaputt]." Bejar added that he would not have been able to make such an ambitious album if Kaputt had not been successful. Recorded with a live band and a pronounced string section, the album's "grand cinematic set of songs" feature Bejar singing with a broader range than before: "This is the first record that I've ever done that comes close to my idea of myself as a singer", Bejar said.

In 2017, Bejar released ken, an album produced by Destroyer drummer Joshua Wells (who was also a member of Black Mountain).

Destroyer's twelfth studio album, Have We Met, was released on January 31, 2020.

On March 25, 2022, the band's thirteenth studio album, Labyrinthitis, was released.

Band name 
In 2002, Bejar said about the band name, "I kind of wanted to go for a rock 'n' roll name. In our own special way we're tearing shit apart, you just have to listen very carefully. Musically I knew it was never going to be a metal band, but I thought lyrically there were fangs to the music." Bejar added in 2008, "I was actually so out of it I didn't know that there was a Kiss record called Destroyer because I didn't know anything about Kiss. I still don't know anything about them. I just thought it was a cool rock-and-roll name, and I was kind of blown away that it hadn't been taken already. I was like, 'I have to use this because it's so weird that no one's used it before.'"

Collaborators 
The ever-evolving band lineup can give the impression that Destroyer is a solo project. However, Bejar has insisted "[t]he music is always collaborative and I think that gets lost in the weird cult of personality shit that seems to get whipped up around me." Although Bejar had claimed that the lineup from certain recording sessions would be permanent, later recording sessions and tours added and dropped musicians. Several band members have the commonality of being from the production team of JC/DC (John Collins and David Carswell).

Some songs recorded for Your Blues originated from Bejar's musical contribution to Sheila Heti's play All Our Happy Days Are Stupid.

On the EP Archer on the Beach (2010), Bejar worked with ambient-music composer Tim Hecker for the title track. Bejar wrote in the press release: "The reason why this has to be seen as a collaboration, rather than strictly a Destroyer release, is that, for the first time, I'm not responsible for any of the music ... aside from the vocals, the general chord progression." On the B-side, the spoken word song "Grief Point", Loscil provided the music. Loscil also composed an extra track, "Loscil's Rubies", on the vinyl version of Destroyer's Rubies.

American visual artist Kara Walker contributed to the lyrics for Kaputts "Suicide Demo (For Kara Walker)". Organized by Merge, Walker sent cue cards with bits of text to Bejar in 2009.

Vancouver artist and Hello, Blue Roses partner, Sydney Hermant has provided the cover art for multiple Destroyer albums, including We'll Build Them a Golden Bridge, This Night, Your Blues, Trouble in Dreams and Labyrinthitis.

Members
Current members
Dan Bejar – lead vocals, guitar, synthesisers 
John Collins – bass guitar, synthesisers, programming, production 
Nicolas Bragg – lead guitar 
Ted Bois – keyboards 
David Carswell – guitar, keyboards, production 
JP Carter – trumpet 
Joshua Wells – drums, percussion, keyboards  

Current touring members
Colin Cowan – bass guitar 

Former members
Scott Morgan – drums, saxophone, clarinet, classical guitar 
Jason Zumpano – keyboards 
Stephen Wood – guitar 
Chris Frey – bass guitar 
Fisher Rose – drums, vibraphone, trumpet 
Tim Loewen – bass guitar 
Pete Bourne – drums 
Joseph Shabason – saxophone, flutes 

Former touring members
Carey Mercer – backing vocals, guitar, organ 
Melanie Campbell – drums 
Michael Rak – bass guitar 
Grayson Walker – keyboards

Discography
Studio albums

We'll Build Them a Golden Bridge (1996)
City of Daughters (1998)
Thief (2000)
Streethawk: A Seduction (2001)
This Night (2002)
Your Blues (2004)
Destroyer's Rubies (2006)
Trouble in Dreams (2008)
Kaputt (2011)
Poison Season (2015)
ken (2017)
Have We Met (2020)
Labyrinthitis (2022)

EPs
Notorious Lightning & Other Works (2005)
Bay of Pigs (2009)
Archer on the Beach (2010)
Five Spanish Songs (2013)

Music videos

References

External links
 Destroyer at Merge Records
 Destroyer at Misra Records
 Dan Bejar's 'Other' Band NPR segment aired March 18, 2006
 Destroyer – Cover story on Destroyer in Exclaim! magazine
 May 2008 Interview with L.A. Record

Musical groups from Vancouver
Canadian indie rock groups
Merge Records artists
Musical groups established in 1995
1995 establishments in British Columbia
Musical groups with year of establishment missing
Dead Oceans artists
Misra Records artists